Sayuri may refer to:

 Sayuri (given name)
 Sayuri (musician) (born 1996), Japanese musician
 Yakob Sayuri (born 1997), Indonesian footballer